The Women's halfpipe event in freestyle skiing at the 2018 Winter Olympics took place on 19 and 20 February 2018 at the Bogwang Phoenix Park, Pyeongchang, South Korea.

Qualification

The top 30 athletes in the Olympic quota allocation list qualified, with a maximum of four athletes per National Olympic Committee (NOC) allowed. All athletes qualifying must also have placed in the top 30 of a FIS World Cup event or the FIS Freestyle Ski and Snowboarding World Championships 2017 during the qualification period (July 1, 2016 to January 21, 2018) and also have a minimum of 50 FIS points to compete. If the host country, South Korea at the 2018 Winter Olympics did not qualify, their chosen athlete would displace the last qualified athlete, granted all qualification criteria were met.

Results

Qualification
The qualification was held on 19 February at 10:00.

Final
The final was held on 20 February at 10:30.

Qualification controversies

Elizabeth Swaney, who represented Hungary, qualified for the Olympics using "a loophole", by attending many World Cup events and just finishing the runs without falling. This has been called a "mockery" and her being labelled as a "scammer" by some people, while being seen by some people as "[a person who has] put in the time and effort to be here" by others.

References

Women's freestyle skiing at the 2018 Winter Olympics